Enixotrophon concepcionensis is a species of sea snail, a marine gastropod mollusk in the family Muricidae, the murex snails or rock snails.

Description

Distribution

References

 Houart R. & Sellanes J. 2006. New data on recently described Chilean trophonines (Gastropoda: Muricidae), with the description of a new species and notes of their occurrence at a cold-seep site. Zootaxa 1222: 53–68.

External links
 Barco, A.; Marshall, B.; A. Houart, R.; Oliverio, M. (2015). Molecular phylogenetics of Haustrinae and Pagodulinae (Neogastropoda: Muricidae) with a focus on New Zealand species. Journal of Molluscan Studies. 81(4): 476-488.

Gastropods described in 2006
Enixotrophon